Zhdanov Shipyard may refer to:

 Severnaya Verf, formerly Zhdanov shipyard, in Saint Petersburg, Russia
 Azov ship-repair factory, in Mariupol (formerly Zhdanov), Ukraine